Dennis Taylor (born 19 January 1949) is a Northern Irish retired professional snooker player and current commentator. He is best known for winning the 1985 World Snooker Championship final, when he defeated the defending champion Steve Davis in one of the most famous matches in snooker history. Despite losing the first eight frames, Taylor recovered to win 18–17 in a dramatic duel on the last . The final's conclusion attracted 18.5 million viewers, setting UK viewership records for any post-midnight broadcast and for any broadcast on BBC Two that still stand.

Taylor had previously been runner-up at the 1979 World Snooker Championship, where he lost the final 16–24 to Terry Griffiths. His highest world ranking of his career was in 1979–1980, when he was second. He won one other ranking title at the 1984 Grand Prix, where he defeated Cliff Thorburn 10–2 in the final, and also won the invitational 1987 Masters, defeating Alex Higgins 9–8 in the final. He made the highest  of his career at the 1987 Carling Challenge, a 141.

Beginning in 1983, Taylor wore distinctive glasses designed by Jack Karnehm specifically for playing snooker. Often described as looking upside-down, they gave him a unique look on the circuit. Since retiring from the main professional tour in 2000, he has been a regular commentator on BBC snooker broadcasts. He competed on the World Seniors Tour until he announced the end of his competitive playing career in 2021, aged 72. Outside snooker, he appeared on the third series of Strictly Come Dancing, finishing eighth alongside dance partner Izabela Hannah.

Career

Early career 
Born on 19 January 1949 in Coalisland, Northern Ireland, Taylor was the son of a lorry driver, and had six siblings. As an amateur, he won the 1968 British Junior Billiards Championship. Taylor turned professional in 1972. That season he made his debut in the World Snooker Championship at the 1973 event, losing 8–9 to Cliff Thorburn in the first round. Over the next few years, Taylor reached the semi-finals at the event in 1975 where he lost 12–19 to Eddie Charlton, and 1977, losing to Thorburn 18–16. Two years later he reached the 1979 final, but lost 16–24 to qualifier Terry Griffiths. He reached his highest world ranking for the   following season, second behind Steve Davis.

He reached the semi-final for a third time in 1984, losing to Davis. His mother died of a heart attack as he was beginning the new season at the 1984 Jameson International. He retired from the event before his quarter-final match against Silvino Francisco. However, he won the first ranking event of his career at the 1984 Grand Prix later that year defeating Thorburn 10–2 in the final.

World Snooker Champion 

Following his first ranking tournament victory, Taylor played in the 1985 World Championship. Seeded 11th for the tournament, he defeated Francisco in the opening round 10–2, Eddie Charlton 13–6 in the second round, Cliff Thorburn 13–5, and Tony Knowles 16–5 to reach the final. In the final, he played three-time winner and world number one Steve Davis. In the four  match, he trailed 0–7 after the first, but bounced back to trail 7–9 overnight after the second. Never being ahead, he took the match to a deciding frame with the scores tied at 17–17. Trailing at 62–44 to Davis in the deciding frame with four  remaining. He potted a long , which he says was one of his best ever shots under pressure.

The final is considered by many to be the greatest snooker match in history and was broadcast to a peak audience of 18 million viewers in the United Kingdom.  this is the highest viewership of any broadcast after midnight in the country, and a record for any programme shown on BBC2. On his return to Northern Ireland, Taylor was awarded the key to the city of Coalisland. He also received a victory parade that 10,000 attended.

Later career 

Taylor reached his fourth ranking event final at the 1985 Grand Prix, later that year. He faced Davis again and went to a deciding frame, but this time was beaten 9–10.  this was the longest one-day final in history with a playing time of over 10 hours. Defending his world title at the 1986 World Snooker Championship, Taylor lost 6–10 in the opening round to Mike Hallett. In 1987, Taylor reached the final of the Masters for the only time in his career, where he played countryman Alex Higgins. Despite trailing 5–8, Taylor won the match 9–8. This would be the last time a Northern Irish player won a Triple Crown event until Mark Allen won the 2018 Masters. Taylor made the highest break of his career, a 141, at the 1987 Carling Challenge, which he won, defeating Joe Johnson in the final.

At the 1990 World Cup, Taylor, Higgins, and Tommy Murphy formed a Northern Irish team. After failing to win the tournament, Higgins threatened Taylor, telling him "if you ever come back to Northern Ireland I’ll have you shot". Shortly afterwards they met in the quarter-finals of the Irish Masters, and a determined Taylor won 5–2. In the next decade, his form dropped, and he fell out of the top 16 in the world rankings in 1995. Taylor retired as a professional in 2000.

Alongside other players managed by Barry Hearn (known as the Matchroom mob) and Chas & Dave, Taylor featured on the music single called "Snooker Loopy". The song spent 11 weeks in the UK Singles Chart in 1986, reaching a peak of sixth. Taylor was known for the distinctive glasses he wore during matches, which had large frames and an unusual 'upside-down' structure that enabled a player to look through the lenses even when down on a shot. The spectacles were a joke in the song, and also commented on by John Virgo in other media. During his career, Taylor won the Irish Professional Championship on six occasions.

After retiring from the Tour, Taylor played matches on the World Seniors Tour and has been a snooker commentator and analyst for the BBC. In May 2021 after losing his match with Barry Pinches at the 2021 World Seniors Championship, Taylor announced that the match was his last competitive game.

On 27 April 2022, it was announced by fellow co-commentator John Virgo that they had been axed by the BBC and that the 2022-23 snooker season would be their last as commentators for the broadcaster.

Personal life 
Taylor made regular guest appearances on snooker television show game show Big Break. In 2005 he took part in the third series of Strictly Come Dancing, reaching eighth place with his partner Izabela Hannah. In February 1990, Taylor opened the Royal Mail sorting office in Blackburn, Lancashire before playing a single-frame challenge match. Taylor currently lives in Llay near Wrexham. His son Damien is a professional golf coach. Taylor supports Blackburn Rovers and Manchester United.

Performance and rankings timeline

Career finals

Ranking finals: 6 (2 titles)

Non-ranking finals: 37 (17 titles)

Pro-am finals: 1 (1 title)

Team finals: 5 (3 titles)

Other wins 
World Trickshot Championship – 1997, 1998, 1999

Bibliography

References

External links 

 Dennis Taylor at WorldSnooker.com

1949 births
Living people
Snooker players from Northern Ireland
Snooker writers and broadcasters
People from Coalisland
Masters (snooker) champions
Trick shot artists
BBC sports presenters and reporters
Winners of the professional snooker world championship